Groveport-Madison High School is a high school in Groveport, Ohio, United States.  The school's mascot is the Cruiser, a horse tamed by John Solomon Rarey.

Cruiser Football 

The current coach for the 2021-2022 season is Mitch Westcamp.

Eastland-Fairfield Career & Technical School

Notable alumni
 Le'Veon Bell, professional football player; selected by Pittsburgh Steelers in second round (48th overall) of 2013 NFL Draft
 Calvin Booth, former professional basketball player and general manager of the Denver Nuggets; selected by Washington Wizards in second round (35th overall) of 1999 NBA Draft
 John Feldmeier, attorney and Wright State University professor
 Thomas J. Hennen, astronaut
 Amor L. Sims, Brigadier general, USMC, during World War I and World War II
 Tony Lowery, former Wisconsin Badgers football quarterback, 1987 Big Ten Freshman of the Year, Arena Football League
 Lilia Osterloh,  professional tennis player
 Bryan Quinby, comedian and co-host of Street Fight Radio
 Eric Smith, professional football player; selected by New York Jets in third round (97th overall) of 2006 NFL Draft with highest compensatory pick in team history
 Wyatt Worthington II, professional golfer
 Dawuane Smoot, professional football player; selected by Jacksonville Jaguars in third round (68th overall) of 2017 NFL Draft
 Michael White, hip-hop artist, better known as Trippie Redd
 Aaron England (as AJ Appeal), credentialed motorsports journalist and racer, covering NASCAR, IndyCar, and NHRA racing events.

External links

References 

High schools in Franklin County, Ohio
Public high schools in Ohio